Monmouth railway station may refer to two former stations in Monmouth, Wales:

 Monmouth Troy railway station
 Monmouth Mayhill railway station